Toxorhina approximata is a species of limoniid crane fly in the family Limoniidae. This species is known from a specimen taken at 1500 meters on Mt. Tsaratanana in Madagascar. The specimen is now stored at the United States National Museum of Natural History.

References

Limoniidae
Insects described in 1951